Orleans is a town in Barnstable County, Massachusetts situated along Cape Cod. The population was 6,307 at the 2020 census.

For geographic and demographic information on the census-designated place Orleans, please see the article Orleans (CDP), Massachusetts.

History
Orleans was first settled in 1693 by Pilgrims from the Plymouth Colony who were dissatisfied with the poor soil and small tracts of land granted to them. Originally the southern parish of neighboring Eastham, Orleans was officially incorporated in 1797. Orleans was named in honor of Louis Philippe II, Duke of Orléans, in recognition of France's support for the 13 colonies during the American Revolution, and because the town did not want an English name, as they had been captured twice by the British during the war.

Early history, like much of the Cape, revolved around fishing, whaling and agriculture. As the fishing industry grew, salt works sprang up in the town to help preserve the catches. However, the town's growth helped deplete the town of lumber, a situation that did not begin to be remedied until the railroad came and brought lumber from the mainland in the mid-to-late 19th century. The rail also helped bring tourism to the town. In 1898, the French Cable Company built a  transatlantic cable to Orleans, which operated from the French Cable Station. The town's historical society is located in the 1834 Universalist Meeting House.

In July 1918, Orleans was shelled by a German submarine; the only attack on the continental U.S during World War I.

The town's tourism industry was helped in 1961 with the creation of the Cape Cod National Seashore by President John F. Kennedy.

Geography
Orleans is bordered by Eastham to the north, the Atlantic Ocean to the east, Pleasant Bay and the town of Chatham to the south, Harwich to the southwest, Brewster to the west, and Cape Cod Bay to the northwest.

Orleans is located on the inner "elbow" section of Cape Cod. Bogs and ponds dot the western part of town, while there are many inlets, islands and harbors along the eastern coast of the town, including Town Cove, Nauset Harbor, Pleasant Bay, and Little Pleasant Bay. Rock Harbor, bounded by and shared with the town of Eastham, is located in the "crease" of the inner elbow and provides boating access to Cape Cod Bay. Cape Cod National Seashore lies along the coast as well.

Transportation
The town line between Eastham and Orleans is the site of the termini of Massachusetts Routes 6A and 28. The two routes join in the Orleans town center and end at a rotary with Route 6 at the Eastham town line. Massachusetts Route 39, which traces a portion of the Brewster town line, ends in the southern part of Orleans at Route 28. Other than two small non-outleted lanes, only Route 6 and Bridge Road pass northward into Eastham. Orleans has no rail or air service in town. The nearest regional air service can be reached in nearby Chatham, and the nearest national and international airport is Logan International Airport in Boston.

Climate

The town of Orleans has a mild summer Humid continental climate (Dfb). The plant hardiness zone is 7a with an average annual extreme minimum air temperature of 4.0 °F (−15.6 °C). The average seasonal (Nov.–Apr.) snowfall total is around 30 in (76 cm). The average snowiest month is February which corresponds to the annual peak in nor'easter activity.

Demographics

As of the census of 2000, there were 6,341 people, 3,087 households, and 1,771 families residing in the town. The racial makeup of the town was 97.57% White, 0.58% Black or African American, 0.17% Native American, 0.54% Asian, 0.14% from other races, and 0.99% from two or more races. Hispanic or Latino of any race were 0.77% of the population.

There were 3,087 households, out of which 14.8% had children under the age of 18 living with them, 49.4% were married couples living together, 6.0% had a female householder with no husband present, and 42.6% were non-families. Of all households, 37.2% were made up of individuals, and 21.9% had someone living alone who was 65 years of age or older. The average household size was 2.00 and the average family size was 2.55.

In the town, the population was spread out, with 13.8% under the age of 18, 3.5% from 18 to 24, 17.3% from 25 to 44, 29.4% from 45 to 64, and 36.0% who were 65 years of age or older. The median age was 56 years. For every 100 females, there were 87.4 males. For every 100 females age 18 and over, there were 84.2 males.

The median income for a household in the town was $42,594, and the median income for a family was $62,909. Males had a median income of $44,246 versus $30,017 for females. The per capita income for the town was $29,553. About 2.7% of families and 6.5% of the population were below the poverty line, including 5.6% of those under age 18 and 5.6% of those age 65 or over.

Government
Orleans is represented in the Massachusetts House of Representatives as a part of the Fourth Barnstable district, which includes (with the exception of Brewster) all the towns east and north of Harwich on the Cape. The town is represented in the Massachusetts Senate as a part of the Cape and Islands District, which includes all of Cape Cod, Martha's Vineyard and Nantucket except the towns of Bourne, Falmouth, Sandwich and Mashpee.  The town is patrolled by the Second (Yarmouth) Barracks of Troop D of the Massachusetts State Police.

On the national level, Orleans is a part of Massachusetts's 9th congressional district, and is currently represented by William R. Keating. The state's senior (Class I) member of the United States Senate, elected in 2012, is Elizabeth Warren. The junior (Class II) member, elected in 2013, is Ed Markey.

Orleans is governed by the open town meeting form of government, and is led by a town manager and a board of selectmen. The town has its own police and fire departments, both headquartered south of the Route 6A – Route 28 intersection. There are three post offices, in East Orleans, Orleans Center and South Orleans. The Snow Library, named for the original benefactor of the library, is located in Orleans Center, and is supported by the Cape Libraries Automated Materials Sharing (CLAMS) library network. The town also operates several beaches, boat landings, and small parks, and has a historical society and museum called the Centers for Culture and History in Orleans which meets in the town's original meeting house (across the street from the current Town Hall). Orleans is the site of a county courthouse, which serves much of the lower Cape.

Education
Orleans, along with Brewster, Eastham and Wellfleet, belongs to the Nauset Regional School District. Each town provides schooling for their own elementary students, and collectively send their middle and high school students to regional schools. Orleans operates the Orleans Elementary School for students from kindergarten through fifth grade. The town is home to Nauset Regional Middle School, which serves students from sixth through eighth grade for the district. High school students attend Nauset Regional High School in North Eastham, but also have the option of attending Cape Cod Regional Technical High School in Harwich free of charge.

Attacks in wartime

Orleans, being on Cape Cod, and thus an exposed portion of the coast, has been a target in wartime. In 1814 its residents repelled an invasion of British marines from HMS Newcastle. Nauset Beach was the only United States site hit by foreign munitions during World War I; the shells were apparently aimed at barges close off shore. This was the first time a foreign entity had fired artillery upon United States soil since the Siege of Fort Texas in 1848.

Orleans Arena Theater
The Orleans Arena Theater was founded by Betsy (born 1922) and Gordon Argo (born 1924) in 1950 for performing summer stock theater in the round. The couple's three children, Allison, Elizabeth and Walter, grew up around the theater and helped their parents run it. The children also acted in some of the theater's productions. Kurt Vonnegut, Jr. wrote a play, Penelope, that was performed at the theater. Penelope later became Happy Birthday, Wanda June, a feature film released in 1971. By 1976 the Argos had long since divorced and for various reasons the theater was sold by Mrs. Argo. It is now known as the Academy of Performing Arts.

Notable people

 John Kendrick (1740–1794), maritime fur trader; one of the first Americans to visit the Pacific Northwest, the Hawaiian Islands, and China
 Victor A. Vyssotsky, mathematician and computer scientist

See also
 Nauset Beach

References

External links

 Town of Orleans official website

 
1693 establishments in Massachusetts
Populated coastal places in Massachusetts
Populated places established in 1693
Towns in Barnstable County, Massachusetts
Towns in Massachusetts